The Fifth District School is a 1901 two story, rectangular, unpainted brick structure situated in the Peaselburg neighborhood of Covington, Kentucky,  USA.  The building comprises 47,308 feet under roof including a 1937 addition measuring 25'x 85'.  The Peaselburg neighborhood consists of modest late 19th and early 20th century dwellings, primarily single family residences.  The building served as an elementary school from 1902 until its closure in 1972 attributable to a decline in the school age population and the need to upgrade the structure to meet revised Board of Education building codes.

The building was designed by Schofield & Rabe, architects from Covington who were only in business for six years, from 1898 to 1904.  Construction began in 1901 and finished on July 22, 1902.

The school was built with six classrooms on each floor.  As the enrollment grew, an addition was constructed in 1937, adding two classrooms on each floor. After the 1972 closure as an elementary school, the building continued as a head start school, but was no longer considered part of the Covington Independent School system.  Adult education programs were added and the school continued to operate until it was finally closed in 1998.  The building was declared surplus property in 2001 and sold to private owners.

References

National Register of Historic Places in Kenton County, Kentucky
Former school buildings in the United States
Defunct schools in Kentucky
Buildings and structures in Covington, Kentucky
School buildings on the National Register of Historic Places in Kentucky
Schools in Kenton County, Kentucky
1901 establishments in Kentucky
School buildings completed in 1901